Hiromu Murakami (Japanese: 村上 弘, Murakami Hiromu; 24 September 1921 – 22 March 2007) was a Japanese politician who served as the third chairman of the Japanese Communist Party from 1987 until 1989.

Biography 
He was born in Innoshima, Hiroshima (today Onomichi) as the fifth of ten children.

A graduate of the Ministry of Communications, he was stationed as a soldier in Hiroshima during the war. In 1946, Murakami became the first chairman at an Osaka-based labor union office, and in the following year, he joined the Japanese Communist Party. In 1948, he was suspected of being the ringleader behind the Hanshin Education Incident, and as a result he spent the next year and eight months in an Osaka prison for violating occupation edicts. Murakami eventually became the chairman of the JCP's Osaka chapter, and in 1967 he attempted to run in Osaka's gubernatorial elections, coming in at third place with 260,661 votes, or only 11.31% of the total votes. However, in 1972 he was elected to the House of Representatives for the first time as a successor to Yokota Jintarō in Osaka's 3rd district. In addition, he also became a committee member of the National Association for Peace, Democracy, and Innovation in Japan, which formed in 1981. He served in a number of formal capacities, such as being the JCP's legislative strategy chairman, the supervisor of its policy committee, and vice president of its board of directors. He would also write a few books on political topics throughout his career.

When then-Chairman Tetsuzo Fuwa was hospitalised for heart disease in March 1987, Murakami became acting chairman, and then was formally elected as the chairman by the JCP's central committee in November. JCP's earlier foreign policy was revised around this time through its recognition of South Korea, and as a result a reporter for the JCP's official Red Flag newspaper was dispatched to the country, among other gestures. However, Murakami announced that he had developed ophthalmoparesis as a result of cerebrovascular disease at a speech in Shiga in February 1989, and later resigned as chairman on 29 May. Kenji Miyamoto appointed Secretary General Mitsuhiro Kaneko to serve as acting chairman in the meantime, but Vice-Chairman Tetsuzo Fuwa was reappointed as chairman once again at the 5th Central Committee General Assembly on 8 June. After resigning, Murakami withdrew from all of his official roles at the JCP as well as from the Diet. He passed away of pneumonia on 22 March 2007.

References 

2007 deaths
1921 births
People from Hiroshima Prefecture
Japanese trade unionists
Japanese Communist Party politicians
Members of the House of Representatives (Japan)
Politicians from Hiroshima Prefecture
Politicians from Osaka Prefecture